Athletes from East Germany (German Democratic Republic; GDR) and West Germany (Federal Republic of Germany; FRG) competed together as the United Team of Germany at the 1960 Winter Olympics in Squaw Valley, United States.

Medalists

Alpine skiing

Men

Women

Biathlon

Men

 1 Two minutes added per missed target.

Cross-country skiing

Men

Men's 4 × 10 km relay

Women

Women's 3 x 5 km relay

Figure skating

Men

Women

Pairs

Ice hockey

Group B 
Top two teams (shaded ones) from each group advanced to the final round and played for 1st-6th places, other teams played in the consolation round.

USSR 8-0 Germany
Germany 4-1 Finland

Final round 

Canada 12-0 Germany
USA 9-1 Germany
USSR 7-1 Germany
Czechoslovakia 9-1 Germany
Sweden 8-2 Germany

Nordic combined 

Events:
 normal hill ski jumping 
 15 km cross-country skiing

Ski jumping

Speed skating

Men

Women

References
Official Olympic Reports
International Olympic Committee results database
 Olympic Winter Games 1960, full results by sports-reference.com

Nations at the 1960 Winter Olympics
1960
Winter Olympics